Rolando Ugolini (4 June 1924 – 10 April 2014) was a footballer, who played as a goalkeeper for a number of British clubs.

Born in Lucca, Italy, Ugolini moved to Scotland at the age of three and grew up in Armadale, West Lothian, where he played for the local club, Armadale Thistle. He appeared as a triallist in the North-Eastern League with Heart of Midlothian. He began his senior career with Celtic, before spending nine years with Middlesbrough. Spells at Wrexham and Dundee United were followed by a final game with Berwick Rangers.

Ugolini died on 10 April 2014. He was 89 years old.

References

1924 births
2014 deaths
Italian footballers
Heart of Midlothian F.C. players
Celtic F.C. players
Middlesbrough F.C. players
Wrexham A.F.C. players
Dundee United F.C. players
Berwick Rangers F.C. players
Scottish Football League players
English Football League players
Italian emigrants to the United Kingdom
Armadale Thistle F.C. players
Scottish Junior Football Association players
People from Armadale, West Lothian
Association football goalkeepers
Footballers from West Lothian